Igor Krmar (Serbian Cyrillic: Игор Крмар; born 14 May 1991) is a Serbian footballer playing with FK Dinamo 1945 in the Serbian League Vojvodina.

Career

Early years
Krmar was born in the Croatian town Vinkovci at the outbreak of the Yugoslavian war, his family fled to Boleč, a suburb of Belgrade. He started playing football in Boleč, later moving to nearby Vinča where he was spotted by scouts and brought to Red Star Belgrade. Although he passed the complete youth ranks of Red Star, he first played professionally in the Serbian League West with Mačva Šabac, where he stayed one year.

The next season, he joined the Kragujevac-based team Radnički 1923, with whom he earned a promotion to the highest league of Serbian football. In his first year in the Serbian SuperLiga he received minimal playing time, and was loaned to Slavija Sarajevo in the Premier League of Bosnia and Herzegovina where he assisted the club in avoiding relegation. In summer of 2012 he joined another Serbian SuperLiga club - FK Smederevo where he spent the full season capping 23 games and scoring 1 goal.

Europe and abroad
In 2013, Krmar had a short spell at Czech's Bohemians Prague where he appeared in 2 matches before returning to the Serbian First League with BSK Borča where he spent 2013-14 season. In 2015, he played the autumn season with Mačva Šabac appearing in 14 games and scoring 1 goal. For the remainder of the season he played overseas with London City in the Canadian Soccer League. He returned to Slavija Sarajevo for a second spell where he played 7 games.

In 2016, Krmar returned to the Canadian Soccer League to play with Hamilton City, where he reached the CSL Championship final. In 2017, he played with FK Bežanija, and FK Sloboda Užice. The following season he played in the Macedonian First Football League with FK Rabotnički. In 2018, he played abroad once more in the A Lyga with FK Atlantas. In January 2019, Krmar joined OFK Sloga Gornje Crnjelovo in the First League of the Republika Srpska.

Serbia
In December 2019, he returned to the Serbian First League to play with FK Zemun. In 2020, he was recruited to join FK Dinamo Pančevo in the Serbian League Vojvodina.

References

External links
 Profile at Srbijafudbal
 
 Personal data at Utakmica.rs

1991 births
Living people
Sportspeople from Vinkovci
Serbs of Croatia
Serbian footballers
Association football midfielders
Serbian expatriate footballers
Expatriate footballers in Bosnia and Herzegovina
Expatriate footballers in the Czech Republic
Expatriate footballers in Lithuania
FK Mačva Šabac players
FK Radnički 1923 players
FK Slavija Sarajevo players
FK Smederevo players
FK Bohemians Prague (Střížkov) players
FK BSK Borča players
London City players
FK Bežanija players
Hamilton City SC players
FK Sloboda Užice players
FK Rabotnički players
FK Atlantas players
FK Zemun players
FK Dinamo Pančevo players
Serbian First League players
Serbian SuperLiga players
Premier League of Bosnia and Herzegovina players
Czech National Football League players
Macedonian First Football League players
A Lyga players
Canadian Soccer League (1998–present) players
First League of the Republika Srpska players
Serbian League players